NH 102 may refer to:

 National Highway 102 (India)
 New Hampshire Route 102, United States